Bull Mountain is a 9,187-foot (2,800 m) elevation summit located in northern Garfield County of Utah, United States. Bull Mountain is part of the Henry Mountains which are set between Capitol Reef National Park to the west, and Glen Canyon National Recreation Area to the east. Mount Ellen is immediately southwest of Bull Mountain, and Burr Desert spreads out to the northeast. It is situated in a dry, rugged, and sparsely settled region, set on primitive land administered by the Bureau of Land Management. Precipitation runoff from this mountain drains into tributaries of the Colorado River. The nearest town is Hanksville, 17 miles to the north, and Robbers Roost is 20 miles to the northeast.

Climate
Spring and fall are the most favorable seasons to visit Bull Mountain. According to the Köppen climate classification system, it is located in a Cold semi-arid climate zone, which is defined by the coldest month having an average mean temperature below 32 °F (0 °C), and at least 50% of the total annual precipitation being received during the spring and summer.

Gallery

See also

 Colorado Plateau
 List of mountain peaks of Utah

References

External links
 Weather forecast: Bull Mountain

Mountains of Utah
Mountains of Garfield County, Utah
North American 2000 m summits